Idalus ochreata is a moth of the family Erebidae. It was described by William Schaus in 1905. It is found in French Guiana, Suriname and Venezuela.

References

 

ochreata
Moths described in 1905